James Reginald Morton (25 October 1905 – 30 March 1999) was an Australian rules footballer who played with North Melbourne in the Victorian Football League (VFL).

Notes

External links 

1905 births
Australian rules footballers from Victoria (Australia)
North Melbourne Football Club players

1999 deaths